Pizzoni is a comune (municipality) in the Province of Vibo Valentia in the Italian region Calabria, located about  southwest of Catanzaro and about  southeast of Vibo Valentia.

Pizzoni borders the following municipalities: Simbario, Sorianello, Soriano Calabro, Stefanaconi, Vazzano.

References

Cities and towns in Calabria